Clarks Summit University is a private Baptist Bible college in Clarks Summit, Pennsylvania. It offers on-campus and online degrees at the undergraduate and graduate levels. These include a high-school dual enrollment option, as well as associate, bachelor's, master's, and doctoral degrees. Baptist Bible Seminary offers master's and doctoral degrees in remote, on-campus and web-enhanced options.

History

The school was founded as the Baptist Bible Seminary in 1932 in Johnson City, New York.

For its first 36 years, the college used the facilities of First Baptist Church in Johnson City. Additional buildings were purchased or built to accommodate the growing student body.

Steady growth of enrollment by the 1960s prompted school leaders to search for a new location. In 1968, a site in Clarks Summit was found with the help of Gov. William Scranton.

The school received its accreditation from the Association for Biblical Higher Education in 1968 and received approval to grant degrees from the Pennsylvania Department of Education in 1969. These developments, along with the offering of associates of arts degrees, led the school to change its name again in 1971, becoming the Baptist Bible College of Pennsylvania. 

The separate Baptist Bible Seminary was spun off in 1972, taking on the original name of the college from its foundation in 1934. Graduate studies began in 1989.
 
The name was changed to the current Clarks Summit University in 2016.

Campus
Clarks Summit University is located on a  suburban campus. The site includes 17 major buildings, athletic facilities, and a 4.5-acre lake.

Huckaby Gymnasium in the Phelps Student Center hosts home basketball and volleyball contests

Academics

The university has more than 80 programs including associate, bachelor's, master's, and doctoral degrees. All students who earn a bachelor's degree earn a major in Biblical Studies as well as their chosen career major. Clarks Summit University is accredited by the Middle States Commission on Higher Education and the Association of Biblical Higher Education. Its education programs are approved by the Pennsylvania Department of Education.

Athletics
The Clarks Summit University Defenders field teams in several sports. 
 
Men's teams include soccer, basketball, golf, cross-country, tennis, volleyball and baseball.

Women's teams include basketball, cross-country, soccer, softball, tennis, and volleyball.

Clarks Summit University is affiliated with both the National Collegiate Athletic Association (NCAA) Division III, and the Colonial States Athletic Conference. 
 
Athletic history includes 75 National Christian College Athletic Association (NCCAA) Division II East Regional Championships in seven sports and 23 NCCAA Division II National Championships in six sports. Defender teams have appeared in three NCAA Division III national tournaments.

Clarks Summit University has had 2 individual National Collegiate Wrestling Association (NCWA) champions in wrestling. There is currently no wrestling at any level at the school.

The Clarks Summit University Defenders colors are royal blue, silver, and black.

The Lady Defender basketball team earned a spot in the NCAA DIII playoffs after winning the Colonial States Athletic Conference championship in 2022.

Notable alumni
 Syracuse University basketball chaplain William Payne 
 Brian Higgins, field expert in public safety and former police chief, Bergen County, NJ 
 Founder and executive director of Grace Relations Dr. Charles Ware 
 Counseling expert and author Robert Kellemen, founder of RPM Ministries 
 Pastor and Author John Elton Pletcher 
 General surgeon who earned the International Surgical Volunteerism Award, Dr. Bruce Steffes 
 Award-winning producer Amy Brodrick 
 Ron Clark Academy Language Arts Teacher Korey Collins 
 Chaplain Colonel James May

References

External links

Official athletics website

Educational institutions established in 1932
Universities and colleges in Lackawanna County, Pennsylvania
Private universities and colleges in Pennsylvania
1932 establishments in Pennsylvania
Colonial States Athletic Conference schools
Former United East Conference schools